Jai Hind High School and Junior College is an educational institute in Pimpri, a town in Pune, India established in year 1949. It is located opposite to the Jijamata Hospital, on the Deluxe Road. The institution comes under the Pimpri-Chinchwad Municipal Corporation. It is a government institute and comes under the administration of the Zilla Parishad. The institute acts as a center for Secondary School Certificate(SSC), Higher Secondary Certificate(HSC), and other equivalent examinations. The school has  4500 students enrolled in 5th grade to  12th grade.

Admissions and curriculum
Jai Hind High School follows the syllabus prescribed by Maharashtra State Board of Education. English is the first language and medium of instruction. Marathi and Hindi are the second and third languages respectively.

Jai Hind Primary School
Jai Hind Primary School is an institute run by the Jai Hind Sindhu Trust. It has classes up to 4th grade after which the students move to Jai Hind High School administered by Zilla Parishad and run by Jain Hind Sindhu Trust.

Jai Hind Junior College
Jai Hind Junior College of Science and Commerce has laboratories for Physics, Chemistry and Biology.

See also
List of schools in Pune

References

Schools in Pune
Education in Pimpri-Chinchwad
Junior colleges in Maharashtra